Sukran is a 2005 Indian Tamil-language action thriller film written, produced and directed by S. A. Chandrasekhar. The film stars Vijay in an extended cameo as the title character with Ravi Krishna and Anita Hassanandani. The music was composed by debutant Vijay Antony with the score composed by Pravin Mani. The film released on 18 February 2005.

Plot
Ravi Shankar and Sandhya, who are students of a college in Dindigul, are in love, but Sandhya faces a problem at home as her uncle is attracted to her. One day, he peeps into her bathroom while she bathes, and she complains about it to her malevolent stepmother, but she forgives and encourages him and tells her that they will one day marry. Sandhya also encourages Ravi, telling him that they will marry.

When Sandhya's stepmother discovers their affair, she pokes her nose in their wheel. Ravi's father, who is very caring and loving, sends them to Chennai. After they reach Chennai, he checks in on them, and in the middle of the phone call, he is killed by Sandhya's stepmother. After that, a corrupt police officer named Mahesh accuses Ravi of murdering his own father and apprehends Ravi on a complaint given by Sandhya's stepmother that he had murdered his own father when he put his foot down on their affair. Ravi is then put behind bars.

Sandhya is persuaded to seek the help of a judge named Needhi Manikkam to get a bail for Ravi. Manikkam, being an incorrect person, blackmails her into sleeping with him, causing her to spit on his face. Sandhya is taken to a palace by the police, where she gets gang-raped by Mahesh, Manikkam, and Tamil Kumaran (Bobby Bedi), the son of Minister Janardhanan. In the meantime, an honest police officer releases Ravi, so that he can save Sandhya. But before Ravi can reach the destination, the trio removes her clothes, bind her to the bed, and rape her by turns, which they also take a video clip of. Ravi tries to save her but is unsuccessful and is beaten by Needhi Manikkam's henchmen. After some time, Sandhya becomes unconscious. Ravi is also unconscious after a severe beating from the goons and getting thrown into the gallows.

After a series of events, Sandhya decides to commit suicide, because she says that she has undergone a lot of pain and anguish, and the pain is so terrible that she cannot forget it until she dies. Ravi is hesitant to let her go because he already lost his parents, and he does not want to lose her. He says that they have lived together, and he says that now that she has decided to die, they should die together because even during death, they should not part. At this juncture, here arrives a criminal lawyer named Sukran, who saves them, teaches them the value of life and advises them to face all the troubles boldly. After that, he tells them to start a new life and to be happy and successful by the time they meet again. They get jobs and money, marry, move into a small house, and have a normal life. One day, when Sandhya is in her nightdress, Mahesh, Manikkam, and Kumaran force her again, causing the couple to get harassed by the police. The incident causes Sandhya to be arrested on false charges of prostitution. All efforts by Ravi to get her out on bail are futile. An agitated Ravi shoots Mahesh, Manikkam, Kumaran, and Sandhya's stepmother dead and escapes with Sandhya from the court.

Sukran steps in and promises to save the couple. He appears on Ravi's behalf and puts forward enough evidence to help him out. He also eventually kills Janardhanan, who was responsible for all the wrongdoings and also due to his previous disputes with him. After that, Sukran himself surrenders to the police, stating that although Janardhanan was a pervert, he should not have done the murder in front of the judge.

Cast

Soundtrack
The soundtrack was composed by debutant Vijay Antony.

Release
The film was released worldwide on 18 February 2005. Prior to its release, the film was awarded an "A" certificate by the Indian Censor Board with 22 cuts, while the UAE censors objected to the film's content and asked for deletion of footage amounting to 32 minutes, not following which the film got banned. The satellite rights of the film were sold to Jaya TV

Critical reception
The Hindu wrote, "Producer, writer and director S. A. Chandrasekaran returns after a hiatus, youthful in imagination and agile in execution — at times too much so [..] Chandrasekaran's yen for courtroom drama, make "Sukran" a cocktail of sorts." Thiraipadam wrote "Vijay's heroic turn and a lacklustre courtroom climax pull down what is until then a realistic story of lovers on the run."

References

External links

2005 films
Indian action thriller films
Indian courtroom films
2000s Tamil-language films
Films scored by Vijay Antony
Films shot at Ramoji Film City
Films shot in Bangalore
Films shot in Chennai
Films shot in Hyderabad, India
Films shot in Visakhapatnam
Films directed by S. A. Chandrasekhar
2005 action thriller films